Princess Kira Auguste Viktoria Friederike of Prussia (27 June 1943 – 10 January 2004) was the fourth child and second daughter of Louis Ferdinand, Prince of Prussia and Grand Duchess Kira Kirillovna of Russia.

Princess Kira was born in Cadienen, East Prussia (today Kadyny, Poland).

She married Thomas Frank Liepsner on 10 September 1973 in a civil ceremony. The religious ceremony was held the next day at Felizenweil. They were divorced in 1984.

They had one daughter, Kira-Marina Liepsner (born 22 January 1977), who married Andreas Felix Paul von Bismarck (31 January 1979 - 31 October 2019) on 7 May 2005 in St. Peter und Paul Church on Nikolskoë, Berlin.

When her father died in 1994, she took his seat on the board of the Kissinger Sommer classical music festival.

She died in Berlin after a long illness. Her urn was buried in Hohenzollern Castle.

Ancestry

References 

1943 births
2004 deaths
People from Elbląg County
House of Hohenzollern
People from East Prussia
Prussian princesses